Services Reconnaissance Department (SRD), also known as Special Operations Australia (SOA) and previously known as Inter-Allied Services Department (ISD), was an Australian military intelligence and special reconnaissance unit, during World War II.

Foundation 
Authorised by Prime Minister John Curtin in March 1942, following the outbreak of war with Japan, the Inter-Allied Services Department was formed on 17 April 1942 having been given approval by General Thomas Blamey and modelled initially on the British Special Operations Executive (SOE); it was organised initially by SOE British Army officer, Lieutenant Colonel G. Egerton Mott. For security reasons it was named ISD and its existence was to be only known by the Prime Minister and the High Command.

Operations 
On 6 July 1942, a controlling body Allied Intelligence Bureau (AIB) was formed to co-ordinate the operations of ISD and other similar organisations and became fully functional in December 1942. ISD was known as Section A within AIB. In February 1943, ISD was disbanded and a new body called Special Operations Australia was formed in April 1943 not under the control of the AIB. Shortly afterwards the cover name of Services Reconnaissance Department (SRD) was given to SOA in May 1943. This was done because of the similarity of the initials SOA to SOE, whose security was likely to compromised. Z Special Unit was transferred to SOA from AIB, and it was decided to form M Special Unit for the AIB.

SOA oversaw intelligence-gathering, reconnaissance and raiding missions in Japanese-occupied  areas of  New Guinea, the Dutch East Indies (Indonesia), Portuguese Timor (East Timor), the Malayan Peninsula, British Borneo and Singapore.

See also
Allied Intelligence Bureau
Coastwatchers
HMAS Nyanie
M Special Unit
Netherlands East Indies Forces Intelligence Service
Pacific War
Secret Intelligence Australia
Z Special Unit

Notes

References

Further reading

 
*  606 pages

Australian intelligence agencies
Special forces of Australia
Intelligence services of World War II